Mahtra is a village in Rapla Parish, Rapla County, Estonia. It has a population of 92 (as of 1 January 2010). Between 1991–2017 (until the administrative reform of Estonian municipalities) the village was located in Juuru Parish.

In 1858 a peasant insurgency called the Mahtra War took place at the Mahtra Manor.

References

Villages in Rapla County
Kreis Harrien